Edgar Lee Boteler, Jr. (February 6, 1920 – March 17, 2016) was an American farmer and politician.

Born in Grenada, Mississippi, Boteler was a farmer at Riverdale Farms. Boteler served in the Mississippi House of Representatives from 1956 to 1972. He was then appointed director of the Mississippi Department of Transportation. Boteler was convicted of embezzling public money. In 1980, he was paroled from prison and, in 1983, his civil rights were restored. Boteler died at his home in Leland, Mississippi.

Notes

1920 births
2016 deaths
People from Grenada, Mississippi
Farmers from Mississippi
Members of the Mississippi House of Representatives
Mississippi politicians convicted of crimes
People from Leland, Mississippi